The 1997 Miami Dolphins season was the team's 32nd overall and 28th as a member of the National Football League (NFL). The Dolphins improved upon their previous season's output of 8–8, winning nine games. Seven of the team's sixteen games were decided by a field goal or less. This was also the season where the Dolphins released a new logo and new uniforms with a darker aqua and dark navy drop shadow in numbers. The uniforms and logo lasted until the 2012 season. During Week 3, the Dolphins were defeated by the defending Super Bowl champion Green Bay Packers for the first time in franchise history. This could be argued as the most cursed of all Dolphins seasons because it offered a turnaround where the New England Patriots defeated the Dolphins 3 times in the 1997 season, sweeping them. This was the first of five consecutive playoff appearances for the Dolphins. This season saw the Patriots return three Marino interceptions for touchdowns in New England (two of them in the 2nd quarter of the week 13 matchup, and one in the Wild Card matchup where the Patriots defeated Miami 17–3). The Wild Card loss came less than a week after the Dolphins lost to the Patriots 14–12 on Monday Night Football in Miami for the AFC East division title. Until 2021, this was the last time the Dolphins swept the New York Jets in back-to-back seasons.

Offseason

NFL Draft

Roster

Schedule 

Note: Intra-division opponents are in bold text.

Playoffs

Standings

References 

Miami Dolphins seasons
Miami Dolphins
Miami Dolphins